Elections were held in Leeds and Grenville United Counties, Ontario on October 27, 2014 in conjunction with municipal elections across the province.

Leeds and Grenville United Counties Council
The Council consists of the mayors and reeves of the constituent municipalities.

Athens

Augusta

Edwardsburgh/Cardinal

Elizabethtown-Kitley

Front of Yonge

Leeds and the Thousand Islands

Merrickville-Wolford

North Grenville

Rideau Lakes

Westport

References

Election 2014

Leeds
Leeds and Grenville United Counties